Michael Lucius Lomax (born October 2, 1947 in Los Angeles, California) has, since 2004, served as the president and chief executive officer of the United Negro College Fund of the United States.

Biography 
Lomax taught literature at Morehouse College and Spelman College, Emory University, the Georgia Institute of Technology and the University of Georgia. For seven years he served as president of Dillard University in New Orleans, Louisiana.  Lomax also served for 12 years as Chairman of the Board of Commissioners of Fulton County. In 1989 and 1993, he was an unsuccessful candidate for mayor of Atlanta. He is on the board of Teach for America, Emory University, The Carter Center, and a member of Sigma Pi Phi fraternity. U.S. President George W. Bush appointed him to the President’s Board of Advisors on Historically Black Colleges and Universities, and United States Speaker of the House J. Dennis Hastert appointed Lomax to the National Museum of African American History and Culture Plan for Action Presidential Commission.

Personal life 
Lomax is the son of Lucius W. Lomax, Jr. (1910–73), a Los Angeles attorney, and Hallie Almena Davis Lomax (1915-2011), a journalist.
 Lomax was the brother of Los Angeles civil rights lawyer Melanie E. Lomax, who died in 2006. Lomax and his wife, Cheryl Ferguson Lomax, have two daughters, Michele and Rachel. His oldest daughter, from a previous marriage to playwright and author Pearl Cleage, Deignan Cleage Lomax, graduated from Dillard University in 2000. Lomax and his family live in Atlanta, Georgia.

He is a member of Alpha Phi Alpha fraternity. Lomax was also inducted into Omicron Delta Kappa in 2000 at Dillard, and was later awarded the organization's highest honor, the Laurel Crowned Circle.

Notes

External links 

Stuart A. Rose Manuscript, Archives, and Rare Book Library, Emory University: Michael Lomax papers, 1772-2010

1947 births
American chief executives
African-American academics
Living people
Dillard University faculty
People from Los Angeles
21st-century African-American people
20th-century African-American people